John H. White (born 1945 in Lexington, North Carolina) is an American photojournalist, recipient of a Pulitzer Prize in 1982.

Early life 
When John H. White was nine years old, a teacher told him that he would grow up to work on a garbage truck because he was slow in math. At home, his father told him to grow up to be his best, to look for the best in others, and if he were to work on a garbage truck, fine—just be sure he's the driver.  White has said that this was a turning point in his life.

Photo career 
White's father also played a pivotal role in his photography. At age 14, White's church burned down and his father asked him to take photos of the destruction and reconstruction. White now credits this first assignment with his focus on photo stories.

After working for the Chicago Daily News, White joined the staff of the Chicago Sun Times in 1978 and worked there until May 2013. White also teaches photojournalism at Columbia College Chicago, and formerly taught at Northwestern University. In 1973 and 1974 White worked for the Environmental Protection Agency's DOCUMERICA project photographing Chicago and its African American community. White's photographs show the difficulties facing residents as well as their spirit and pride.

White was awarded the Pulitzer Prize for Photojournalism in 1982 for his "consistently excellent work on a variety of subjects." He was selected as a photographer for the 1990 project Songs of My People. White has also won three National Headliner Awards, was the first photographer inducted into the Chicago Journalism Hall of Fame, was awarded the Chicago Press Photographer Association's Photographer of the Year award five times, and, in 1999, received the Chicago Medal of Merit.

Hal Buell, the former head of the Associated Press Photography Service, noted that White is one of the best photographers at capturing the everyday vignette. White has published a book about Cardinal Bernardin, but he has yet to publish a book of his work outside the religious realm.

White has said that he lives by three words: faith, focus, flight. "I'm faithful to my purpose, my mission, my assignment, my work, my dreams. I stay focused on what I'm doing and what's important. And I keep in flight—I spread my wings and do it."

References

External links

Keep In Flight.com
John H. White: Portrait of Black Chicago
DOCUMERICA - John H White 180 photos on Flickr

1945 births
Living people
African-American photographers
American photojournalists
Columbia College Chicago faculty
Pulitzer Prize for Feature Photography winners
Chicago Sun-Times people
21st-century African-American people
20th-century African-American people